Asiavorator is an extinct genus of carnivorous, cat-like civet endemic to Asia in the Oligocene.

The teeth of Asiavorator suggest that the beasts were omnivorous or more precisely, ranged from hypercarnivorous to mesocarnivorous.

Taxonomy
Asiavorator was named by Spassov and Lange-Badré (1995). It was assigned to Aeluroidea by Hunt (1998). There is one known species, Asiavorator gracilis.

References

Viverrids
Oligocene mammals of Asia
Oligocene feliforms
Prehistoric carnivoran genera